Now is the tenth studio album by blues rock band Ten Years After, released in 2004.

Longtime band member Alvin Lee had left the band to be replaced by singer/guitarist Joe Gooch alongside Chick Churchill (keyboards), Leo Lyons (bass), and Ric Lee (drums).

Track listing
 "When It All Falls Down" (Churchill, Gooch, Lee, Lyons) – 3:29
 "Hundred Miles High" (Churchill, Gooch, Lee, Lyons) – 7:07
 "Time to Kill" (Hans Koller, Lyons) – 4:33
 "I'll Make It Easy for You" (Churchill, Gooch, Lee, Lyons) – 5:34
 "The Voice Inside Your Head" (Churchill, Gooch, Lee, Lyons) – 4:34
 "King of the Blues" (Tony Crooks, Lyons) – 3:36
 "Long Time Running" (Gooch, Lyons, Mark Pullin) – 6:15
 "Reasons Why" (Gooch, Lyons, Pullin) – 4:42
 "Changes" (Churchill, Gooch, Lee, Lyons) – 5:14

Personnel
Ten Years After
Joe Gooch – guitar, vocals
Leo Lyons – bass
Ric Lee – drums
Chick Churchill – organ

References

2004 albums
Ten Years After albums